Taunton is the county town of Somerset, England, with a 2011 population of 69,570. Its thousand-year history includes a 10th-century monastic foundation, Taunton Castle, which later became a priory. The Normans built a castle owned by the Bishops of Winchester. Parts of the inner ward house were turned into the Museum of Somerset and Somerset Military Museum. For the Second Cornish uprising of 1497, Perkin Warbeck brought an army of 6,000; most surrendered to Henry VII on 4 October 1497. On 20 June 1685 the Duke of Monmouth crowned himself King of England here in a rebellion, defeated at the Battle of Sedgemoor. Judge Jeffreys led the Bloody Assizes in the Castle's Great Hall. The Grand Western Canal reached Taunton in 1839 and the Bristol and Exeter Railway in 1842. Today it hosts Musgrove Park Hospital, Somerset County Cricket Club, is the base of 40 Commando, Royal Marines, and is home to the United Kingdom Hydrographic Office on Admiralty Way. The popular Taunton flower show has been held in Vivary Park since 1866, and on 13 March 2022, St Mary Magdalene parish church was elevated to the status of Taunton Minster.

History

The town name derives from "Town on the River Tone or Tone Town. Cambria Farm, which now hosts a park and ride close to the M5 motorway Junction 25, was the site of Bronze and Iron Age settlement and a Roman farm. There was a Romano-British village near the suburb of Holway. Taunton was important in Anglo-Saxon times as a burh with a mint. King Ine of Wessex threw up an earthen castle about 700, but it was levelled in 722 by his queen, Æthelburg of Wessex, to prevent seizure by rebels.

A monastery was founded before 904. The bishops of Winchester owned the manor, and obtained the first charter for their "men of Taunton" from King Edward in 904, freeing them from all royal and county tribute. Some time before Domesday, Taunton became a borough with privileges and a population of some 1,500, including 64 burgesses governed by a portreeve appointed by the bishops. Somerton took over from Ilchester as county town in the late 13th century, but declined; the county-town status passed to Taunton about 1366. Between 1209 and 1311 the Bishop of Winchester's manor of Taunton expanded two-and-a-half times. The parishes of Staplegrove, Wilton and Taunton were part of Taunton Deane hundred.

In 1451, during the Wars of the Roses, Taunton saw a skirmish between the Earl of Devon, and Baron Bonville. Queen Margaret and her troops passed through in 1471 to defeat at the Battle of Tewkesbury. In the Second Cornish uprising of 1497 most Cornish gentry supported Perkin Warbeck's cause and on 17 September a Cornish army some 6,000 strong entered Exeter before advancing on Taunton. Henry VII sent his chief general, Giles, Lord Daubeney, to attack the Cornish. When Warbeck heard that the King's scouts were at Glastonbury he panicked and deserted his army. On 4 October 1497, Henry VII reached Taunton, where he received the surrender of the remaining Cornish army. Ringleaders were executed and others fined a total of £13,000.

Taunton Castle changed hands several times in the Civil War of 1642–1645, as did the town. During the Siege of Taunton it was defended by Robert Blake from July 1644 to July 1645, and suffered destruction of many medieval and Tudor buildings. On 20 June 1685, the Duke of Monmouth crowned himself King of England at Taunton during the Monmouth Rebellion. In the autumn of that year Judge Jeffreys lived in the town during the Bloody Assizes that followed the Battle of Sedgemoor.

The town lacked a charter of incorporation until 1627. This was renewed in 1677, but lapsed in 1792 due to vacancies in the corporate body, and was not reincorporated until 1877. The medieval fairs and markets (a weekly market remains) were celebrated for the sale of woollen cloth called "Tauntons" made in the town. On the decline of the woollen industry in the west of England, silk-weaving was introduced at the end of the 18th century.

In 1839 the Grand Western Canal reached Taunton, aiding southward trade, which was enhanced by the arrival of the railway in 1842.

A permanent military presence came to Jellalabad Barracks in 1881.

In the Second World War, the Bridgwater and Taunton Canal formed part of the Taunton Stop Line, set to curb any advance of a German invasion. Pillboxes can still be seen along its length.

Regeneration
Taunton was rated "strategically important" in the government's Regional Spatial Strategy, allowing Somerset County Council to receive funding for large-scale regeneration projects. In 2006, the council revealed plans dubbed "Project Taunton". This would see regeneration of the areas of Firepool, Tangier, the retail town centre, the cultural quarter, and the River Tone, to sustain Taunton as business hub in the South West.

The Firepool area, just north of the town centre by the main railway station, includes vacant or undeveloped land. The council is promoting sustainable, high-quality, employment-led mixed-use development to attract 3,000 new jobs and 500 new homes.

In Tangier, a brownfield area between Bridgwater & Taunton College and the bus station, the project proposes to build small offices and more riverside housing.

The "Cultural Quarter" is the area along the river between Firepool and Tangier. The plans are to extend riverside retail and attract smaller, boutique businesses such as those found at Riverside.

Plans for the town centre include more pedestrianisation and greater sizes and numbers of retail units.

Several sites along the River Tone are set for renovation. Firepool Weir lock, long silted up, was to be dredged in 2011 to allow boats to pass from the navigable section of the Tone through Taunton to the Bridgwater and Taunton Canal. Goodland Gardens received a makeover and a new café, The Shed, opened. Projects to develop Somerset Square (a paved area next to the Brewhouse Theatre) and Longrun Meadow (a country park near Bridgwater & Taunton College) have been put forward.

Traffic congestion was identified as an obstacle to further economic growth. Part of the strategy was a new road infrastructure consisting of a £7.5 million link road to ease traffic in the town centre (Taunton's "Third Way"), completed in 2011, and a Northern Inner Distributor Road linking Staplegrove Road, the station and Priory Avenue at a planned cost of £21 million, opened in 2017.

Governance

Borough Council

Taunton was the main settlement and centre of the local government district of Taunton Deane. The district, formed on 1 April 1974 under the Local Government Act 1972, by merging the municipal borough of Taunton, Wellington urban district, Taunton Rural District, and Wellington Rural District, was granted borough status in 1975, perpetuating the mayoralty of Taunton. The district was named as an alternate form of the Taunton hundred. Taunton Deane Council, once based at the Municipal Buildings in Corporation Street, moved to modern facilities at Deane House on Belvedere Road in spring 1987.

Taunton Deane merged with West Somerset to form Somerset West and Taunton in 2019.

County Council

Somerset County Council, based at County Hall in Taunton, consists of 55 councillors. The town  has broadly six electoral divisions, each with a single county councillor: Taunton North; Taunton East; Taunton South; Bishop’s Hull & Taunton West; Comeytrowe & Trull, Monkton & North Curry (which includes rural areas).  Three are Liberal Democrats, two are Conservative and one is an independent.

On 18 March 2022 the Government confirmed that Somerset's county council and four district councils will be replaced by a single unitary authority from 1 April 2023 with elections for the new authority's 110 councillors (2 per electoral division) taking place on 5 May 2022. The new unitary authority will be called Somerset Council.

Parliament
Taunton Deane is a county constituency of the House of Commons. It is based on the town, but extends to Wellington and small villages and parts of Exmoor. The current MP is Rebecca Pow of the Conservative Party.

Geography
Taunton lies on the River Tone between the Quantock, Blackdown and Brendon hills. The area is known as the Vale of Taunton. It is surrounded by many other large towns and cities seen on this directional compass:

Geology
The Taunton area has Permian red sandstones and breccia outcrop 295–250 million years old. Rocks of Triassic age (248–204 million years ago) underlie much of Somerset's moors and levels.

Nature reserves
The several local nature reserves in and around Taunton are protected under Section 21 of the National Parks and Access to the Countryside Act 1949. South Taunton Streams is an urban wetland. The northern suburbs include the Children's Wood riverside reserve, a movement corridor for animals such as otters along the banks of the Tone. Birds include the kingfisher, dipper, grey wagtail, mute swan, grey heron and reed warbler and butterflies the small and large skipper, marbled white, small heath and small copper, along with dragonflies and damselflies.

Weirfield Riverside, a nature reserve along the River Tone, has alder and willow woodland, bramble, scrub and rough grassland. The wetter, flood-prone areas include hemlock water-dropwort, and yellow flag. Silk Mills Park and Ride offer landscaping and ponds in three areas by the Tone. The woodland and grassland support aquatic and marginal vegetation, with various birds, bats, reptiles and invertebrates. Frieze Hill Community Orchard has turned from allotments to rough grassland and orchard. Among the apples grown are Kingston Black and Yarlington Mill.

Climate
Like most of South West England, Taunton has a temperate climate, wetter and milder than the rest of the country. Seasonal temperature variation is less extreme because of the adjacent sea. In the summer the Azores high pressure affects the south-west of England, but convective cloud sometimes forms inland, reducing the sunshine hours. Annual sunshine rates are slightly under the regional average of 1,600 hours. Most of the rainfall in the south-west is caused by Atlantic depressions or by convection – in autumn and winter by the former, which are then at their most active. In summer, much rainfall results from the sun heating the ground, leading to convection, showers and thunderstorms. Some 8–15 days of snowfall are typical. November to March have the highest mean winds and June to August the lightest. The prevailing wind direction is from the south-west.

Demography

The town of Taunton (which for population estimates includes the unparished area or former municipal borough plus the neighbouring parishes of Bishop's Hull, Comeytrowe, Norton Fitzwarren, Staplegrove, Trull and West Monkton) had an estimated population of 61,400 in 2001. Taunton includes Holway, once a village in its own right as one of the Five Hundreds of Taunton Deane, the Infaring division or district of three districts that made up Taunton Deane.

Taunton is the largest town in the Somerset shire county and forms part of the larger borough of Taunton Deane, which includes the town of Wellington and surrounding villages. This had an estimated population of 109,883 in 2010.

The figures here are for the Taunton Deane area.

In 2011, Taunton built-up area had a population of 60,479 and the surrounding borough of Taunton Deane one of 110,187. Of Taunton's residents 91.6 per cent were White British in 2011, compared with 93.4 per cent for Taunton Deane. Taunton's ethnic mix resembles that of South West England – 91.8 per cent White British in the same year. It is also matches other major regional centres like Poole and Plymouth. The larger urban area, extending to Monkton Heathfield, Norton Fitzwarren and Bathpool, had a 2011 population of 64,621.

Economy

Taunton Deane had low unemployment of 4.1 per cent compared with a national average of 5.0 per cent in 2005.

Taunton is home to the United Kingdom Hydrographic Office (UKHO), a Ministry of Defence body responsible for providing navigational and other hydrographic information for national, civil and defence requirements. The UKHO is located on Admiralty Way and has a workforce of about 1100. At the start of the Second World War, chart printing moved to Taunton, but the main office did not follow until 1968. Taunton holds the head offices of Western Provident Association, Viridor and CANDAC. Other professional services are based at Blackbrook near the motorway junction.

The first store of the multinational New Look clothing retailer opened in Taunton in 1969. Taunton is also famed for cider.

Landmarks

Gray's Almshouses in East Street, founded by Robert Gray in 1615 for poor single women, are red brick buildings bearing the arms of Robert Gray, dated 1635, and another arms of the Merchant Tailors. A small room used as a chapel has original benches and a painted ceiling. It has been classed by English Heritage as a Grade I listed building.

St Margaret's Almshouses was founded as a leper colony in the 12th century. Glastonbury Abbey acquired patronage of it in the late 13th century and rebuilt it as almshouses in the early 16th. From 1612 to 1938 the building continued as such, cared for by a local parish. In the late 1930s it was converted into a hall of offices for the Rural Community Council and accommodation for the Somerset Guild of Craftsmen. It later fell into disrepair. The Somerset Buildings Preservation Trust with Falcon Rural Housing purchased and restored it for use as four units of social housing. It is a Grade II* listed building.

The grounds of Taunton Castle include the Somerset County Museum and The Castle Hotel, which incorporates the Castle Bow archway. With the municipal buildings they form a three-sided group just beyond the Castle Bow archway from Fore Street. The centre of the square is a car park, and a plain brick Mecca Bingo hall fills the west side of it.

The frontage of the Fore Street Tudor Tavern, now a Caffè Nero branch, dates from 1578, but the rest is thought to be from the 14th century.

The riverside area north of the centre is edged by Morrisons supermarket, retirement housing and the Brewhouse Theatre. Towards the centre are the Zinc Nightclub, Bridge Street and Goodlands Gardens. A current regeneration programme north of Bridge Street will include redeveloping the County Cricket Ground, which hosted open-air concerts for Elton John in 2006 and 2012 and for Rod Stewart in 2014.

Shopping
Hankridge Farm, a retail park close to the M5 motorway, has stores that include Currys PC World, Oak Furniture Land, Hobbycraft, Halfords, B&Q, The Range and the town's second Sainsbury's. There is a Venue in the park with restaurants, an Odeon cinema and a Hollywood Bowl bowling alley. It is now known as Riverside Retail Park.

Taunton has three other such parks. Belvedere is near the town centre. St Johns is just off Toneway, towards the motorway, and consists of two units, occupied by DFS, joined by Go Outdoors in April 2014. Taunton's second largest retail park is Priory Fields in Priory Avenue, with eight units and an anchor store, Wickes. It was redeveloped in 2003 to modernise a rather worn-out retail park and increase retail floor space.

The Old Market was a farmers' market in the Parade in front of Market House, but then moved to the Firepool area, although cattle trading on the site ceased only in 2008. A large indoor shopping centre to the east of the Parade covers a site that was once a pig market. Although its official name is now Orchard, and before that the Old Market Centre, locals still call it the Pig Market; one existed there from 1614 to 1882.

County Walk is a small indoor shopping arcade in the town centre with an anchor supermarket, Sainsbury's, and several other large national retailers such as Subway, Costa Coffee, and Savers.

Public parks

Taunton's public parks include Vivary Park, Goodlands Park and Victoria Park. The most notable is Vivary, on land that was once a medieval fish farm or vivarium for Taunton Priory and Taunton Castle. Fronted by a pair of cast iron gates from the Saracen Foundry of Glasgow, it contains the Sherford Stream, a Tone tributary that flows through the  park, which is near the town centre. It has two main open spaces and a war memorial dating from 1922, a miniature golf course, tennis courts, two children's playgrounds, a model railway track added in 1979, and an 18-hole, 4620-yard, par-63 golf course. The park includes trees, rose beds and herbaceous borders, with some 56,000 spring and summer bedding plants used each year. The rose garden includes the Royal National Rose Society Provincial Trial Ground. Taunton Flower Show held annually in the park since the 19th century. It has been described as "The Chelsea of the West", and draws some 24,000 visitors over two days. Goodlands Gardens, in the centre of the town, is behind the Debenhams department store and The Castle Hotel.

Pride Rainbow Path

The Pride Rainbow Path in Goodland Gardens, Taunton town centre, runs alongside the River Tone. Designed by Jenny Keogh and Liz Hutchin of GoCreate, it opened on 28 June 2021 to mark the anniversary of the Stonewall riots, which served as a catalyst for the gay rights movement. It is believed to be the first such path in the UK. The opening coincided with the first Taunton Pride in July 2021 and the Pride inspired Art Trail.

While using the traditional LGBTQ+ colours, the far end of the 62-metre path includes a chevron of the progress colours: black, brown, light blue, pink, and white stripes to reflect ethnic diversity. The path has been designed not to require maintenance for 15 years. It was funded by Taunton's Emergency Town Centre Recovery Fund and is intended to reflect Taunton's commitment to inclusivity and diversity.

Transport

Rail
Taunton railway station is on the Bristol to Exeter line, the Reading to Taunton line, and the Cross Country Route. There is generally a fast and a slow train each hour to Bristol Temple Meads and Exeter St Davids and a train an hour to London Paddington.

The Buses of Somerset route 28 links the stations at Taunton and Bishops Lydeard.

In 2009, Project Taunton, the authority responsible for Taunton's regeneration project, revealed proposals for Taunton metro rail, under a transport sustainability plan. They were not implemented.

Road
Taunton has road links with the M5 motorway junctions 25 (Taunton) and 26 (Wellington) close to the town, and other major roads such as the A38 and A358. The Taunton bypass section of the M5, between the two junctions, opened in April 1974 and relieved the town of heavy holiday traffic on the A38. Taunton Deane services use that motorway section.

A strong economy increases traffic; in 2011 the County Council foresaw a sharp rise from 2001 levels. Two major roads opened: the Third Way (A3807) linking Bridge Street and Castle Street in 2011, and the Northern Inner Distributor Road (A3087) between Staplegrove Road and Priory Avenue in July 2017.

2011 M5 crash

On the evening of 4 November 2011, 34 vehicles met with an accident near junction 25 of the M5 motorway northbound, on the north-eastern edge of the town at West Monkton. Seven people were killed and a further 51 injured.

Buses and coaches

Many local services are provided by The Buses of Somerset: town services and routes to Minehead, Bridgwater, Weston-Super-Mare and elsewhere. Other services are provided by Hatch Green Coaches. Services were also operated by Webberbus until the firm closed on 12 May 2016. Taunton bus station was in Tower Street from 1953 until 2020. Most services now terminate at stops on The Parade or Castle Way.

A park-and-ride service is run by The Buses of Somerset between the Taunton gateway near the M5 Motorway and Silk Mills on the north-west side of town.

Berrys Coaches, based in Taunton, operates several "Superfast Services" to London. National Express Coaches runs long-distance coach services to many destinations.

Air
The nearest airports are Exeter and Bristol, both within  of Taunton.

Trams

Taunton Tramway opened on 21 August 1901. Six double-decker cars operated on a  gauge line between the railway station and the depot at East Reach. In 1905 the service was withdrawn for two months while the track was improved; the cars were replaced by six single-decker cars and the old double deckers sold to Leamington Spa. However, the price of its electricity was due to rise in 1928 to a level the firm refused to pay, and it offered to sell out, but this was not accepted. The electricity was cut off on 28 May 1921 and the system closed.

Canal
The Bridgwater and Taunton Canal is a navigable waterway that links Taunton with Bridgwater, opened in 1827. Having been closed to navigation in 1907, it re-opened after restoration in 1994.

Education

State secondary schools in Taunton include The Castle School, Heathfield Community School, Bishop Fox's School and The Taunton Academy. Further education is offered by Richard Huish College, The Taunton Academy (sponsored by Richard Huish College) and Bridgwater and Taunton College. Heathfield Community School has a post-16 further education college specialising in performing arts and technical theatre called The SPACE (The Somerset Performing Arts Centre for Education). Heathfield Community School is also a teaching school and the base of Taunton Teaching Alliance. The Taunton campus of Bridgwater and Taunton College is a partner of Plymouth University and includes University Centre Taunton. There are three co-educational private schools: Queen's College, King's College and Taunton School.

In March 2009, it was found that Jim Knight, Minister of State for Schools and Families, had approved the closure of Ladymead Community School and the nearby St Augustine of Canterbury RC/CoE School in the Priorswood area of Taunton. They gave way in September 2010 to the Taunton Academy.

Young people with special educational needs are provided for by two special schools and one complex Pupil Referral Unit (PRU). Sky College caters for boys aged 10–18 who have social, emotional and mental-health difficulties. Selworthy School has pupils of 4–19 who have complex and multiple learning difficulties, while the Taunton Deane Partnership College is a complex PRU for children in Key Stages 2, 3 and 4, with a Medical Tuition Service, Outreach & Advisory Service and an Area Access Team.

Health services
Taunton is within Somerset Primary Care Trust and home to Musgrove Park Hospital, within Somerset NHS Foundation Trust. This is one of two district hospitals in Somerset, alongside Yeovil District Hospital. A Nuffield Hospital also lies in the town, run privately by Nuffield Health. The town has several medical surgeries and a family planning clinic, an occupational health centre and a chiropractic clinic.

Religious sites

The Taunton Minster Church of St Mary Magdalene, built of sandstone more in the South Somerset style, retains an attractive painted interior, but its prime feature is a 15th and 16th-century tower rebuilt in the mid-19th century. It was termed by Simon Jenkins, "the finest in England. It makes its peace with the sky not just with a coronet but with the entire crown jewels cast in red-brown stone." It holds 12 bells and 3 bells "hung dead" for the clock.

Close by is the parish church of St James near the centre of Taunton close. The oldest parts are early 14th century; there are fragments of 15th-century glass in the west end. Like St Mary's, it has a sandstone tower, but built to a less impressive design. It too was rebuilt in the 19th century, in this case due to building defects in the original. It backs onto the County Ground.

The church of St John the Evangelist was built in 1858 to serve the poor of the town. The church of St Andrew, built 1878, serves the area of Rowbarton.

In the later 17th century, Taunton had two Dissenting places of worship: "Paul's Meeting" and the Baptist Meeting. The former was built at the top of Paul Street soon after 1672 on a bowling green behind the Three Cups Inn, now The County Hotel, and rapidly became one of the largest congregations in the county. After Mayor Timewell sacked both Paul's Meeting and the Baptist Meeting in 1683, the dissenters were driven to worship in private houses on the outskirts of Taunton, where their assemblies were regularly raided by the Justices of the Peace. Paul's Meeting survived attempts to turn it into a workhouse, and with the coming of William III and Mary II, followed by the Toleration Act 1688, it reopened. Hugh Willoughby, 15th Baron Willoughby of Parham, was educated in early life at Taunton Dissenters' Academy. The Baptist Meeting became the Baptist New Meeting, registered in 1691 and rebuilt in 1721 as Mary Street Chapel.

Taunton Unitarian Chapel, dating from 1721, stands in Mary Street. Dr Malachi Blake, who founded the Taunton and Somerset Hospital in East Reach, Taunton, was also a preacher there, attending in 1809 a celebration of the 50th year of George the Third's reign. The chapel retains its original interior, including Flemish oak pillars in Corinthian style. The pews and pulpit are also in oak. There is an early 18th-century candelabra.

St George's, the town's Roman Catholic church, dates from the mid-19th century. It was the second Catholic church built in Taunton since the Reformation, replacing a smaller St George's Chapel. The main building is designated by English Heritage as a Grade II* listed building, while the clergy house is Grade II listed.

Culture
Taunton town centre has the Brewhouse Theatre. It closed in February 2013 due to financial difficulties, but reopened in April 2014 under the Taunton Theatre Association (TTA), which was granted the 61-year lease that Taunton Deane Borough Council had bought on the site and its contents from the administrator. Tacchi-Morris Arts Centre is a professional theatre based at Heathfield Community School, hosting touring theatre, dance and comedy, and productions by South West schools and colleges. Tacchi-Morris Arts Centre also runs community classes. The Creative Innovation Centre CIC has an arts and culture venue in the town centre.

Several concerts a year are held at Taunton's largest church, St Mary Magdalene. In recent years The Sixteen, The Tallis Scholars and Gabrieli Consort have all performed to full audiences. Taunton also has several choirs and orchestras that perform in the town's churches and school chapels. Many music and drama groups are members of the Taunton Association of Performing Arts (TAPA), which produces a diary and calendar of performances in and about the town.

Taunton has three radio stations: BBC Somerset, Tone FM and Apple FM.

Since 2001 Taunton has been the base of a domestic violence charity, the ManKind Initiative, to help male victims of domestic abuse.

Cultural references
Taunton is mentioned in The Remains of the Day by Kazuo Ishiguro, Tinker, Tailor, Soldier, Spy by John le Carré, and Evelyn Waugh's Scoop. It was given the fictitious name "Toneborough" by Thomas Hardy.

Sport

Taunton Rugby Football Club (RFC), based in Taunton, currently play in National League 1, having achieved back-to-back promotions in 2009 and 2010 and then again in 2020. It played at Priory Park Sports Ground from 1935 to 2001, before moving to the Commsplus Stadium.

The County Ground was originally home to Taunton Cricket Club, formed in 1829. It played at the County Ground until 1977, before moving to Moorfields, Taunton, in conjunction with Taunton Vale Hockey Club, since when the County Ground has been solely used by Somerset County Cricket Club (CCC). Somerset CCC was formed in 1875, but did not achieve first-class status until 1891. The County Ground has a capacity of 8,500; the ends are called the River End and the Marcus Trescothick Pavilion End. It is the current home of the England women's cricket team. The Somerset Cricket Museum is nearby.

Taunton Cricket Club has since 2002 been located at the new Taunton Vale Sports Club Ground in Staplegrove, which features two cricket fields. The Taunton Vale ground is also a regular home venue for Somerset's Second XI. Taunton Deane Cricket Club has a ground adjacent to Vivary Park, while Taunton St Andrews Cricket Club is based at the nearby Wyvern Sports and Social Club. All three clubs play in the West of England Premier League or one of its feeder leagues.

Taunton Town Football Club (FC) plays at Wordsworth Drive. An earlier Taunton Town FC played at Priory Park in the 1930s, however the current team was formed in 1947 by local businessmen as Taunton FC, changing to the current name in 1968, and played its first friendly fixture in 1948. For most of its history, Taunton belonged to the Western League. It spent a six-season spell in the Southern League from 1977, and after a further period in the Western League, returned to the Southern League in 2002, after winning the FA Vase in 2001. The club won the Division One South and West league title in 2017/18 and narrowly missed out on further promotion in 2018/19. The club went on to become the 2021/22 champions of the Southern League Premier Division South, securing promotion to the National League South for the first time in the club's history on 23 April 2022.

Somerset Vikings is a rugby league club formed in 2003 as part of the Rugby Football League's plans to develop the game beyond its traditional north-of-England areas. Initially the side was made up of a mixture of Royal Marines based in Taunton and Exeter with local rugby union players keen to try the 13-man code. It plays at Hyde Park, also home to Taunton RFC.

The Taunton Tigers is a semi-professional basketball team competing in the English Basketball League Men's Division 1. The team plays its home games at Wellsprings Leisure Centre, which seats 500.

Although racing had been held in the area before, the first race at thi site was held on 21 September 1927. The Orchard Stand and Paddock Stand provide catering facilities and are used for meetings and conferences on days when racing is not taking place. Greyhound racing was held at the Priory Park Sports Ground and County Cricket ground in the past.

Notable residents
The following were born or have lived in Taunton:

 Colin Addison (born 1940), professional footballer and manager born in Taunton
 Jenny Agutter (born 1952), actress born in Taunton
 Joseph Alleine (1634–1668), Nonconformist pastor and author
 William Larkins Bernard (1843–1922), architect born in Taunton
 Pattie Boyd (born 1944), actress and model; former wife of George Harrison, then Eric Clapton
 Jos Buttler (born 1990), England cricketer
 Carole Cadwalladr (born 1969), author and Pulitzer Prize-winning investigative journalist
 Arthur C. Clarke (born 1917), author of 2001: A Space Odyssey, educated at Huish school
 Matt Colton (born 1975), mastering engineer, studied in Taunton
 Deborah Criddle (born 1966), a Taunton-born para-equestrian winner of three golds at the Athens 2004 Summer Paralympics and three medals at the London 2012 Summer Paralympics in London. She currently lives in nearby Trull.
 John Crockford (c. 1823–1865), publisher
 William Crotch (1775–1847), composer and Principal of the Royal Academy of Music, is buried at Bishops Hull Church, Taunton.
 Stephen Daldry (born 1960), three times Academy Award nominee and Tony Award-winning stage and film director and producer
 Samuel Daniel (1562–1619) a poet, playwright and historian, born "near Taunton".
 Charles George Gordon (1833–1885), UK army general known as Gordon of Khartoum, attended the former Fullands School.
 Sir Benjamin Hammet (c. 1736–1800), businessman, banker and Taunton native, served as its MP in 1782–1800, and as High Sheriff of London. He was elected Lord Mayor of London in 1797 but declined to serve
 Antony Hewish (1924-2021), astronomer and Nobel Prize for Physics winner
 Rebecca Huxtable (born 1981), Taunton-born radio personality and producer, formerly co-producing The Scott Mills Show on BBC Radio 1
 Alexander William Kinglake (1809–1891), barrister, travel writer and historian, was born at Wilton House near Taunton.
 Scott Laird (born 1988), footballer with Scunthorpe United
 Jack Leach (born 1991), Somerset County Cricket Club and England cricketer
 Lee Martin (born 1987), Taunton-born footballer with Millwall F.C.
 Deborah Meaden (born 1959), Taunton-born business mogul, philanthropist and star of the TV series Dragons Den
 William Ellis Metford (1824–1899), Taunton-born engineer known for the Metford rifling in the .303 Lee-Metford service rifle of the late 19th century
 Ciara Michel (born 1985), member of Team GB Olympic volleyball squad, the first to play in the Olympic Games
 John Mole (born 1941), poet and jazz musician born in Taunton
 Frank Montague Moore (1877–1967), Taunton-born painter and first director of the Honolulu Museum of Art
 Alfred B. Mullett (1834–1890), architect to Abraham Lincoln, born in Taunton
 James Northcote (born 1987), actor and film producer, was a pupil of King's College, Taunton.
 Justin Pipe (born 1971), professional darts player
 James Purefoy (born 1964), Taunton-born actor, starred in the joint HBO/BBC series Rome''.
 Viv Richards (born 1952), Antiguan-born West Indies cricketer resident in Taunton while playing for Somerset, 1974–1986
 Gary Rhodes (1960–2019), celebrated head chef at the Castle Hotel, Taunton, 1986–1990
 Andy Robinson (born 1964), Taunton-born England rugby union international and head coach, now head coach of Scotland
 Ivor Salter (1925-1991), actor, born in Taunton
 Miranda Shearer (born 1982), author born in Taunton, since resident in Spaxton, Over Stowey and Taunton
 Juno Temple (born 1989), actress
 Hugh Trenchard, 1st Viscount Trenchard (1873–1956), Taunton-born military officer involved in founding the Royal Air Force
 Marcus Trescothick (born 1975), England cricketer, recipient of the Taunton Deane Citizenship Award in 2005
 Sir Charles Trevelyan, 1st Baronet (1807–1886), Governor of Madras, born in Taunton
 James Turle (1802–1882) an organist and composer.
 Phil Vickery (born 1961), celebrity chef
 Frederick Porter Wensley (1865–1949), chief constable of Scotland Yard CID, born in Taunton
 David Henry Wilson (born 1937), writer known for children's stories such as the Jeremy James series
 Jeremy Wright (born 1972), born in Taunton and attending Taunton School, became Attorney General for England and Wales and a Conservative MP

Twinning
Taunton is twinned with Lisieux in France, Königslutter in Germany, and Taunton, Massachusetts in the US.

See also

References

External links

 
 Social, economic and political data on Taunton from the Vision of Britain website
 Taunton regeneration 

 
County towns in England
Market towns in Somerset
Towns in Taunton Deane
Unparished areas in Somerset